Heterachthes mucuni is a species of beetle in the family Cerambycidae. It was described by Martins and Galileo in 1999.

References

Heterachthes
Beetles described in 1999